Robert William "Blowtorch Bob" Komer (February 23, 1922 – April 9, 2000) was an American national security adviser known for managing Civil Operations and Revolutionary Development Support during the Vietnam War.

Early life and education 
Born in Chicago, Illinois and raised in St. Louis, Missouri. Komer graduated from Harvard College and Harvard Business School, later training at Camp Ritchie and its Military Intelligence Training Center, making Komer one of the Ritchie Boys. Like many Ritchie Boys, he later joined the Central Intelligence Agency in its infancy in 1947.

Career 
Komer served on the staff of the National Security Council, which was led by McGeorge Bundy. After Bundy's departure, Komer briefly succeeded Bundy as interim National Security Advisor, before he was assigned to the Vietnam pacification campaign.

While with the NSC, Komer and others negotiated with Israeli prime minister Levi Eshkol a memorandum of understanding (MOU) about Israeli nuclear capabilities. The March 10, 1965, MOU, variously interpreted since, said 'Israel would not be the first country to "introduce" nuclear weapons to the Middle East'.

Komer arrived in South Vietnam in May 1967 as the first head of the newly created Civil Operations and Revolutionary Development Support program, the most controversial aspect of which was the Phoenix program, which William Colby later testified resulted in 20,587 deaths. CORDS was an agency with a staff of both civilians and military personnel, but it fell under the authority of the Military Assistance Command, Vietnam. President Lyndon Johnson had sent Komer to South Vietnam to provide impetus to the nation-building efforts of the new organization. Komer was known for his brusque management style, which had endeared him to the president and earned him the nickname "Blowtorch Bob" from U.S. ambassador Henry Cabot Lodge, Jr. As head of CORDS, he commanded all pacification personnel in South Vietnam.

However, the problems CORDS faced were intractable and the results of Komer's work ambiguous. In a revealing discussion with military historians, Komer said "everybody and nobody" was responsible for counter-insurgency against the communist Vietcong guerrillas. He said it "fell between stools which accounted for the prolonged failure to push things on a large scale even though many correctly analyzed the need". Komer focused his work on the expansion of village militias loyal to the South Vietnamese government, believing they could provide local security against guerrillas.

Komer left South Vietnam in 1968 upon being appointed ambassador to Turkey, and he was succeeded as head of CORDS by William E. Colby, who would later become head of the CIA. Komer also later worked as a consultant at the Rand Corporation and in the Jimmy Carter administration as the Under Secretary of Defense for Policy.

Ambassador Komer, known for his success in garnering support in a hostile environment like Vietnam, tried to calm down the relations to the Turkish population, which was furious due the presence of US soldiers of the 6th US Navy Fleet in Istanbul, who had an exclusive access to certain theaters. He ordered that the US military presence should be adapted to only the necessary, navy fleet visits were to be halted and NATO facilities would be operated by Turkey. But he was not as successful in Turkey as he was in Vietnam, and he left a special mark in Turkish history: on January 6, 1969, at the beginning of his tenure as the US ambassador to Turkey, his car was set on fire in Middle East Technical University by a group of students who then formed the core of the Marxist-Leninist movement in Turkey under the banner of Dev-Genç. Komer was visiting the campus at the invitation of university president Kemal Kurdas, who relied on American donors to finance the building of the modern campus.

In the 1980s, Komer became a vocal critic of "The Maritime Strategy", which was devised by Secretary of the Navy John Lehman. Komer argued against spending the resources for 600 ships, part of a controversial plan to deter and contain the Soviet Union.

Personal life
Robert Komer married Jane and later divorced her. He later married Geraldine.

Awards and honors 
On December 23, 1967, he was presented with the Presidential Medal of Freedom by President Lyndon Johnson.

Death and legacy 
Komer died on April 9, 2000.

Sources
The American Presidency Project

References

Bibliography
 Hunt, Richard A. Pacification: The American Struggle for Vietnam's Hearts and Minds (Boulder, CA: Westview Press, 1995).
 Jones, Frank Leith. 'Blowtorch: Robert Komer and the Making of Vietnam Pacification Policy', Parameters (Autumn 2005).
 Jones, Frank Leith. Blowtorch: Robert Komer, Vietnam, and American Cold War Strategy. 2013.

External links
Interview About U.S. Maritime Strategy from the Dean Peter Krogh Foreign Affairs Digital Archives
Frank Jones Discusses Robert Komer at the Pritzker Military Museum & Library

1922 births
2000 deaths
Ritchie Boys
American people of the Vietnam War
Harvard College alumni
Ambassadors of the United States to Turkey
United States Under Secretaries of Defense for Policy
People from Chicago
Presidential Medal of Freedom recipients
Harvard Business School alumni
United States Deputy National Security Advisors
20th-century American diplomats